Cucumaria is a genus of sea cucumbers.

Species
The following species are recognised in the genus Cucumaria.
Cucumaria adela Clark, 1946
Cucumaria anivaensis Levin, 2004
Cucumaria arcuata (Hérouard, 1921)
Cucumaria compressa (R. Perrier, 1898)
Cucumaria conicospermium Levin & Stepanov, 2002
Cucumaria crax Deichmann, 1941
Cucumaria diligens D'yakonov & Baranova in D'yakonov, Baranova & Savel'eva, 1958
Cucumaria djakonovi Baranova, 1980
Cucumaria dudexa O'Loughlin & Manjón-Cabeza, 2009
Cucumaria duriuscula Sluiter, 1901
Cucumaria fallax Ludwig, 1875
Cucumaria flamma Solis-Marin & Laguarda-Figueras, 1999
Cucumaria frondosa (Gunnerus, 1767) – orange-footed sea cucumber
Cucumaria fusiformis Levin, 2006
Cucumaria georgiana (Lampert, 1886)
Cucumaria ijimai Ohshima, 1915
Cucumaria insperata D'yakonov & Baranova in D'yakonov, Baranova & Savel'eva, 1958
Cucumaria irregularis Vaney, 1906
Cucumaria joubini Vaney, 1914
Cucumaria koreaensis Östergren, 1898
Cucumaria lamberti Levin & Gudimova, 1998
Cucumaria lateralis Vaney, 1906
Cucumaria levini Stepanov & Pil'ganchuk, 2002
Cucumaria miniata (Brandt, 1835) – orange sea cucumber
Cucumaria munita Sluiter, 1901
Cucumaria obscura Levin, 2006
Cucumaria okhotensis Levin & Stepanov, 2003
Cucumaria pallida Kirkendale & Lambert, 1995
Cucumaria paraglacialis Heding, 1942
Cucumaria parassimilis Deichmann, 1930
Cucumaria perfida Vaney, 1908
Cucumaria periprocta Vaney, 1908
Cucumaria piperata (Stimpson, 1864)
Cucumaria planciana (Delle Chiaje, 1841)
Cucumaria pseudocurata Deichmann, 1938
Cucumaria pusilla Ludwig, 1886
Cucumaria sachalinica D'yakonov, 1949
Cucumaria salma Yingst, 1972
Cucumaria savelijevae Baranova, 1980
Cucumaria solangeae Martins & Souto, 2015
Cucumaria tenuis Ludwig, 1875
Cucumaria vaneyi Cherbonnier, 1949
Cucumaria vegae Théel, 1886 – tiny black sea cucumber or northern tar spot
Cucumaria vicaria Sluiter, 1910
Cucumaria vilis Sluiter, 1901

References

Cucumariidae
Holothuroidea genera
Taxa named by Henri Marie Ducrotay de Blainville